The China–Japan–South Korea trilateral summit is an annual summit meeting held between the People's Republic of China, Japan and South Korea, three major countries in East Asia and the World's 2nd, 3rd & 9th Largest Economies. The first summit was held during December 2008 in Fukuoka, Japan. The talks are focused on maintaining strong trilateral relations, the regional economy and disaster relief.

The summits were first proposed by South Korea in 2004, as a meeting outside the framework of the ASEAN Plus Three, with the three major economies of East Asia having a separate community forum. In November 2007 during the ASEAN Plus Three meeting, the leaders of China, Japan, and South Korea held their eighth meeting, and decided to strengthen political dialogue and consultations between the three countries, eventually deciding on an ad hoc meeting to be held in 2008.

In September 2011, the three countries launched the Trilateral Cooperation Secretariat in Seoul. The Secretary-General is appointed on a two-year rotational basis in the order of Korea, Japan, and China. Each country other than the one of the Secretary-General nominates a Deputy Secretary-General respectively.

Summits

Leader summits

Foreign Ministers' Meetings

Finance Ministers and Central Bank Governors' Meetings

Economic and Trade Ministers' Meetings

Health Ministers' Meetings

Environment Ministers' Meetings

Culture Ministers' Meetings

Leader summits at EAS

1st trilateral summit (2008) 
The first separate meeting of the leaders of the three countries was held in Fukuoka, Japan. During the meeting, the "Joint Statement between the three partners" was signed and issued, which identified the direction and principles behind cooperation between China, Japan and South Korea. The conference adopted the "International Financial and Economic Issues Joint Statement", "Disaster Management of the Three Countries Joint Statement" and "Action plan to promote cooperation between China, Japan and South Korea".

Trilateral relations
One of the topics discussed focused on the improvement of future relations between the three countries, from strategic and long-term perspectives. Prior talks between the three countries have been hindered specifically by various territorial and historical disputes. Chinese premier Wen Jiabao stated that "China is willing to make joint efforts with Japan to continue to develop the strategic and mutually beneficial ties in a healthy and stable manner, to benefit the peoples of the two countries and other nations in the region as well." Japanese prime minister Tarō Asō also expressed that he believed the best manner in dealing with the economic crisis of 2008 was economic partnership. There is also speculation of a future regional Free trade area. Such co-operation would greatly benefit the three nations, which account for two thirds of total trade, 40% of total population and three quarters of the GDP of Asia (20% of global GDP), during the ongoing economic crisis.

2nd trilateral summit (2009) 
The second summit was held in the Great Hall of the People in Beijing. Despite the worries of limitations that the summit has faced in 2008, this all changed in 2009, when Japan, China and Korea were forced to coordinate and cooperate more closely to manage the regional effects of the global financial crisis.

In their joint statement on the crisis, the trio identified the need to cooperate on global issues (such as financial risk) and in global institutions, including at the G20. While a reaction to global events, this cooperation began to significantly affect the management of East Asia. Over the course of 2009, the three nations resolved their long running dispute over contributions (and thus voting weight) in the Chiang Mai Initiatives, the first major ‘success’ of the ASEAN Plus Three process. The three nations also worked together to push through a general capital increase at the Asian Development Bank to help it fight the effects of the global financial crisis, a decision mandated by the G20 but about which the US appeared ambivalent.

3rd trilateral summit (2010) 
The third summit among these three countries was held in Jeju, Korea. The prime minister of Korea, Lee Myung bak hosted the meeting and China's prime minister, Wen Jiabao, Japan's prime minister Yukio Hatoyama attended the meeting. One document called the 2020 Cooperation Prospect was released, which firstly emphasized that the three countries will face up to history and cooperate for the future development. Also, looking forward to the specific goals that should be achieved in the next ten years, this document stressed the importance to concentrate on the cooperation in different fields.

In the progress of institutionalizations and improvements of the partnership, the leaders decided to enhance the communication and strategic mutual trust. The leaders agreed to establish a secretariat in Korea in 2011 to confront the natural disaster, discuss the possibility to build up the 'defense dialogue mechanism', improve the policing cooperation and boost the communication among the government. In terms of sustainable development and common prosperity, the leaders said they would try to complete the survey of the Trilateral Free Trade Area before 2012; improve the trade volume; enhance trade facilitation and they restated that they would attach great importance to the customs cooperation; make efforts to the negotiation about investment agreement and offer necessary infrastructure for the improvement of the free flow of investment capital; enhance the coordination of the financial departments; improve the effectiveness of the multilateral Chiang mai initiate; reject all forms of trade protectionism; improve the cooperation in science and innovation; and strengthen the cooperation and consultation policies in the fields of industry, energy, the energy efficiency and resource.

4th trilateral summit (2011) 
Because the previous three summit meetings covered a wide range of world issues, they did not produce any concrete outcome. There was no agreement on North Korea's nuclear development or on the March and September 2010 incidents involving North Korea. Moreover, although the leaders of the three countries had agreed to set up a permanent secretariat headquartered in Seoul to facilitate trilateral cooperation, it has still not been implemented. The three leaders had also agreed to strengthen mutual understanding and trust, expand cooperation in trade, investment, finance, and environmental protection. Not much progress has been achieved in these areas as well over the past one year.

The fourth meeting was held in the wake of the nuclear accident at Fukushima and the natural disaster in Japan. Prime Minister Kan Naoto proposed to hold the summit in Fukushima to convey the message to the world that Fukushima has already become a safe place. The Japanese government hoped that if the heads of the three countries gather in the crisis-stricken city, radiation fears will be mitigated. However, due to logistic problems, the meeting could not be held in Fukushima and instead was held in Tokyo.

While Japan was accused of not providing its neighbours with accurate information when radioactive materials leaked at Fukushima, the summit led to agreement to establish an emergency notification system, enhance cooperation among experts, and share information in the event of emergencies.

5th trilateral summit (2012) 
14 May 2012, Leaders from China, Japan, and South Korea concluded the Fifth Trilateral Summit Meeting and signed the Trilateral Agreement for the Promotion, Facilitation and Protection of Investment (hereinafter referred as the Trilateral Agreement) at a summit in Beijing. The Trilateral Agreement represents a stepping stone towards a three-way free trade pact to counter global economic turbulence and to boost economic growth in Asia.

According to a joint declaration, the three nations will further enhance the “future-oriented comprehensive cooperative partnership” to unleash vitality into the economic growth of the three countries, accelerate economic integration in East Asia, and facilitate economic recovery and growth in the world.

In the joint declaration, the three nations list directions and prioritization of future cooperation, which includes enhancing mutual political trust, deepening economic and trade cooperation, promoting sustainable development, expanding social, people-to-people and cultural exchanges, and strengthening communication and coordination in regional and international affairs.

Among all these proposals, the signing of the Trilateral Agreement and the decision to endorse the recommendation from the trade ministers to launch the trilateral FTA negotiations within this year are at the top of the priority list in deepening economic and trade cooperation.

6th trilateral summit (2015) 
The 6th trilateral summit was held on 1 November 2015 in Seoul, resuming the summit since 2012 due to varieties of disputes and issues ranging from World War II apologies to territorial disputes among the three nations. During the summit, Chinese Premier Li Keqiang, Japanese Prime Minister Shinzō Abe, and South Korean President Park Geun-hye agreed to meet annually in order to work towards deepening trade relations with the proposed trilateral free trade agreement. They also agreed to pursue the six-party talks over North Korea's nuclear weapons program.

7th trilateral summit (2018) 
The 7th trilateral summit was held on 9 May 2018 in Tokyo, resuming the summit since 2015.

TCS Secretary-General
 Shin Bong-kil  (1 September 2011 - 31 August 2013)
 Rui Matsukawa  & Mao Ning  (Deputies)
 Shigeo Iwatani  (1 September 2013 - 31 August 2015)
 Chen Feng  & Lee Jong-heon  (Deputies)
 Yang Houlan  (1 September 2015 – 31 August 2017)
 Lee Jong-heon  & Akima Umezawa  (Deputies)
  Lee Jong-heon (1 September 2017 – 31 August 2019)
 Yamamoto Yasushi  & Han Mei  (Deputies)
  Hisashi Michigami (1 September 2019 – 31 August 2021)
 Jing Cao  & Kang Do-ho  (Deputies)
  Ou Boqian (1 September 2021 – present)
 Bek Bum-hym  & Sakata Natsuko  (Deputies)

Countries data and comparison

Demographics

Largest municipals in China, Japan, & South Korea

Military

Economy

Credit ratings

Organization and groups

Airport traffic
Top busiest airports by passenger traffic (2019)

Top busiest airports by international passenger traffic (2018)

Top busiest airports by cargo traffic (2019)

Top busiest city airport systems by passenger traffic (2018)

See also 

Trilateral Cooperation Secretariat
China–Japan–South Korea Free Trade Agreement
Economy of ChinaJapanSouth Korea
Relations between China and JapanChina and South KoreaJapan and South Korea
Disputes between Japan and Korea
Senkaku Islands dispute
Socotra Rock dispute
Financial crisis of 2007–08
2008 in China
East Asia

Notes

References

External links
 Trilateral Cooperation Secretariat (official website)

2000s economic history
2008 conferences
2008 in China
2008 in international relations
2008 in Japan
2008 in South Korea
21st-century diplomatic conferences (Asia-Pacific)
Annual events in Asia
Diplomatic conferences in Japan
Great Recession
Politics of East Asia
China–Japan–South Korea relations